Frida Hansen ( March 8, 1855 - 12 March 1931) was a Norwegian textile artist in the Art Nouveau style. She has been described as a bridge between Norwegian and European tapestry, and several of her weaving designs are considered among the best made in recent European textile art.
The works of Frida Hansen are owned by a number of museums, including the National Museum - Museum of Applied Art in Oslo, Drammen Museum, Stavanger Art Museum and the Nordic Museum in Stockholm.

Early life
Frederikke Boletta Petersen was born at Hillevåg in Stavanger, Norway. Her parents were Mathilde F. Helliesen (1824-1915) and Peter Sickerius Petersen (1811-1875). She grew up in a very wealthy home.  Her father was a merchant and head of J. A. Köhler & Co.
Before she married, Frida was determined to be a painter, and she received drawing and painting lessons from Bernhard Hanssen, Kitty Kielland and Johan Bennetter. In 1873, Frida married merchant Hans Wilhelm Severin Hansen (1842–1920), the brother of the painter Carl Sundt-Hansen. When Frida's father died in 1875 the couple moved to Köhlerhuset in Hillevåg. Frida eagerly engaged in building a garden on the property.

In 1888 the city was hit by an economic downturn. Plough & Sundt, the family business that Hans Wilhelm ran, went bankrupt. He fled abroad for a few years, and Frida was left with sole responsibility for the family. Two of her three children died. In order to obtain an income, she started an embroidery business in her own home. In the embroidery shop old tapestries were repaired and from doing that repair work she became interested in the ancient techniques that were used to create the images.

In 1889 she was a participant in the first course in weaving in the country, hosted by Randi Blehr at Laerdal in Sogn. When the introductory course was given Frida Hansen acquired an Oppstad loom, and she quickly began to create her own images. After a short time she started selling tapestries, and she also had exhibitions in several Norwegian cities. In May 1892 Frida moved to Oslo and founded  "Atelier for national Tæppevæving", complete with a dyeing workshop. Her knowledge about dyeing yarn was the basis for the yarn Norges Husflidslag had for sale.

Study abroad
In the spring of 1895 Frida Hansen was able to study abroad, first to Cologne to study medieval art and then to Paris to study life drawing. The impetus she brought from abroad was crucial to her development. In Europe, the prevailing art movement was in the process of change from the national and tradition-bound to symbolism and Art Nouveau (Jugendstil).

Det norske Billedvæveri

During the period 1897–1906, Frida Hansen ran Det norske Billedvæveri, a workshop which mainly worked out of her patterns. At the workshop Frida did both drawing, weaving and teaching. At the World Exhibition in Paris in 1900 Frida Hansen was awarded gold medal for her carpet Melkeveien. The carpet was already purchased for the Museum für Kunst und Gewerbe Hamburg. Experimental techniques led to a special transparent weave, which Frida patented. This technique was used to create porters or room dividers.

After the turn of the century, Art Nouveau gradually went out of fashion, and by 1920 the art of Frida Hansen was no longer as much in demand. In 1915 Frida Hansen received the King's Medal of Merit in gold for her work as a textile artist. From 1926 until her death in 1931 Frida Hansen worked on the St. Olav wall carpet at Stavanger Cathedral. Frida Hansen died in Oslo and was buried at the cemetery of Ullern Church.

Work

Frida Hansen's work forms a bridge between Norwegian and European tapestry. Nature was an important source of inspiration, and flowers were special to Frida. She was strongly influenced by the theory of English textile designer William Morris. Nature was the key which Morris showed conscientiously with abstraction and simplification. When Frida wanted to abstract a flower, she drew it straight from above or from the side, just as Morris had done before her. Hansen was particularly concerned that the textiles should not be woven paintings, but should have their own expression. What she and Morris had in common was respect and humility towards nature. Frida was very fond of flowers and her love of flowers is also found in her tapestries.

Her tapestries were often faulted for not expressing Norwegian art and culture. In the 1890s and early 1900s, Norwegian nationality was important with art (among other things) identifying the typical Norwegian essence. Frida responded to the criticism by making art that was more international, much as the decorative art of Morris. One of Frida's works hangs in the Royal Palace in Oslo. There are two national rugs designed by Gerhard Munthe, but woven by Frida. Munthe believed that she was the best in the country for the task. Carpets hanging in the castle are from the Saga of Sigurd the Crusader. The design was first drawn on carton and later transferred to the loom. Often a workshop consisted of people with different tasks: one person who dyed yarn and arranged cardboard, and the weaver who transferred to the loom. However Frida did everything herself. Frida was technically adept. She usually created full size cartoons, dyed the yarn and took care of the transfer.

References

Literature

 Knut Berg ed. (1981). Norwegian Art History, volume 5 - National growth. Gyldendal Norwegian Publishers, Oslo.  . 
 Thue, Annika (1986): Frida Hansen. A European in Norwegian textile art around 1900. Universitetsforlaget. 
 Thue, Annika (1973): Frida Hansen (1855-1931) European to the Norwegian art tapestry. Oslo.

1855 births
1931 deaths
People from Stavanger
Norwegian tapestry artists
Norwegian designers
Norwegian artists
Norwegian weavers
Norwegian textile designers
Art Nouveau artists
19th-century women textile artists
19th-century textile artists
Norwegian embroiderers